The following highways are numbered 412:

Canada
Newfoundland and Labrador Route 412
  Ontario Highway 412

Israel
Route 412 (Israel)

Japan
 Japan National Route 412

United Kingdom 
A412 road

United States
  U.S. Route 412
  Georgia State Route 412 (unsigned designation for former proposed Interstate 175)
 New York:
  New York State Route 412
 County Route 412 (Albany County, New York)
  County Route 412 (Erie County, New York)
  Ohio State Route 412
 Oklahoma:
  Oklahoma State Highway 412A
  Oklahoma State Highway 412B
  Oklahoma State Highway 412P
  Pennsylvania Route 412
  Puerto Rico Highway 412
  South Carolina Highway 412
  Virginia State Route 412
  Wyoming Highway 412